William Willcox may refer to:

William H. Willcox (1832–1929), American architect and surveyor
William B. Willcox (1907–1985), American historian
William Russell Willcox (1863–1940), American politician

See also
William Wilcox (disambiguation)